Spunk! is the fifth and final album by Swamp Zombies. It was released on the Doctor Dream Records label in 1993.

Track listing
"Purple"
"Daddy Long Legs"
"Mudbog"
"She's a Drag"
"She's So Far Out She's In" (originally performed by Dino, Desi, & Billy)
"Ashtray"
"I Love You, Etc."
"The Man With the Golden Gun" (from the James Bond film of the same name)
"Oatmeal"
"Come on Man, Let's Go"
"The Way I Walk"
"Missing Link"
"I Built a Wall"
"Ripoff Boy"
"Track 15"

Swamp Zombies albums
1992 albums